PLP Architecture is an architecture firm based in London. In June 2016, the firm received planning permission for 22 Bishopsgate, the tallest tower in the City of London.

History
The firm was founded by Lee Polisano, former President of the American firm Kohn Pedersen Fox (KPF), David Leventhal, former KPF Senior Partner, and Fred Pillbrow, Karen Cook and Ron Bakker, all former KPF Partners, following their departure from the firm's London office in 2009. Pilbrow soon left the start-up to start his own firm.

Projects

The Edge
In 2015, PLP completed the world's most sustainable office building according to the Building Research Establishment (BRE), The Edge, in Amsterdam. Bloomberg has also called the Edge, "the smartest building in the world".

22 Bishopsgate
In June 2016, PLP received planning permission for 22 Bishopsgate, which will be the tallest tower in the City of London, a 62-storey multiple tenancy office tower developed by a consortium led by AXA Real Estate. The building is expected to provide workspaces for nearly 12,000 people, and to be the first building in London to be WELL Certified, a building rating system focused on human health and wellness.

Collective Old Oak

In May 2016, PLP completed Collective Old Oak, the world's largest co-living building. In addition to 546 co-living rooms, the project includes co-working, community and retail spaces on the lower floors, as well as two terraces and amenity spaces.

Sky Headquarters 
Opened in December 2016, the headquarters for Sky UK accommodates over 3500 employees in a large, sky-lit warehouse-like space, covered by the largest timber roof in the UK.  The project has received multiple awards including 'Best New Workplace' by New London Architecture.

Four Seasons Abu Dhabi 
In February 2016, the Four Seasons Abu Dhabi, designed by PLP, opened on Al Maryah Island overlooking the Louvre Abu Dhabi. Inspired by the textiles of the souk, the building is clad in a colorful pattern of vertical terracotta baguettes that shield the rooms from direct sunlight.

Other notable projects
In 2016 the practice completed the new biomedical research facility for the Medical Research Council, The Francis Crick Institute north of the British Library, together with HOK.

Their commercial development at Nova Victoria in London's City of Westminster (for which they also prepared the masterplan) won the 2017 Carbuncle Cup for the ugliest building in the United Kingdom.

Projects under construction, among others, are: the new Crossrail over-site development at Bond Street tube station,. Research projects include; Oakwood Tower research, in collaboration with Cambridge University and Smith and Wallwork Engineers, a study into wooden skyscrapers and CarTube, a mobility concept which combines two existing modes of transport, automated electric cars and mass transit, into a single, seamless underground road system.

Projects in progress
The company has submitted planning proposals for London's first Microapartment building on Stratford's High Street, the redevelopment of Sampson House and Ludgate House on the southbank next to the Tate Modern into London's densest residential area, and a 43-storey hotel at 150 Bishopsgate, the first luxury hotel to be built in Central London in 30 years. The firm also designed luxury residential development Mayfair Park Residences located near Hyde Park.

Other clients
In addition to working across the Middle East and Asia, PLP Architecture has worked with some of the most significant land developers in London and the UK, including Land Securities, Grosvenor, Heron International, and Mace Group. Other clients include the Qatar Foundation, Mubadala, Burberry and King's College London.

Office locations
The firm's offices are located in the 1930s Art Deco Ibex House building in the City of London, which also houses the Fairtrade Foundation, while it also maintains an office in Beijing and Tokyo.

Awards
London's Nova Victoria mixed-use development by PLP Architecture won the 2017 Carbuncle Cup, described by award panelist Catherine Croft as a 'crass assault on the senses'.

References

British companies established in 2009
Architecture firms based in London
2009 in London
2009 establishments in England